Nikos Maragkidis (alternate spelling: Maragidis) (Greek: Νίκος Μαραγκίδης; born June 23, 1997 in Athens, Greece) is a Greek professional basketball player who last played for Ionikos Nikaias of the Greek Basket League.

High school career
Maragkidis played High school basketball with Impact Basketball Academy at Las Vegas, Nevada.

College career
Maragkidis played college basketball at Green Mountain College and at Poultney, Vermont. He stayed for only one year at Green Mountain before returning to Greece.

Professional career
In 2017, after playing with the youth squads of Maroussi and Panionios, Maragkidis began his professional career with the Greek League club Panionios. 

The next year, Maragkidis signed with SAM Basket Massagno of the Swiss Basketball League. He left the team in October without appearing in a single game and he returned to Greece, where he joined Ethnikos Piraeus of the Greek 2nd division. 

Maragkidis started the 2019-2020 season once more with Panionios and then made a mid-season transfer to fellow Greek Basket League club Ionikos Nikaias. On August 29, 2020, Maragkidis renewed his contract with Ionikos.

References

External links
Real GM Profile
Eurobasket.com Profile
ncsasports.org Profile

1997 births
Living people
Panionios B.C. players
Ionikos Nikaias B.C. players
Greek men's basketball players
Green Mountain College alumni
Basketball players from Athens
Greek expatriate basketball people in the United States